is a four-member Japanese rock band signed to Being label. The band incorporates various sounds and genres, including reggae, hip-hop, metal, and emo.

Knock Out Monkey was founded in Kobe, Hyōgo Prefecture, in 2001; however, none of the founding members are with the band anymore. W-shun joined the band a while after its formation as the guitarist, and later on was also responsible for the vocals following the leave of their former vocalist. The band experienced several member changes until 2009; since then the current lineup is in place.

Members

Discography

Studio albums

Mini-Albums

Singles

References

External links
Official website
Official YouTube page
Official Facebook page
Official Twitter page
Official SoundCloud page

Japanese rock music groups
Musical groups from Hyōgo Prefecture
Being Inc. artists
Musical quartets
Musical groups established in 2001